The Pierre Chauveau Medal is a biennial award of the Royal Society of Canada "for a distinguished contribution to knowledge in the humanities other than Canadian literature and Canadian history". 

The award consists of a silver medal and is named in honour of Pierre-Joseph-Olivier Chauveau (1820–1890), who was a Canadian lawyer, writer, orator, educator and statesman. He was the second President of the Royal Society of Canada and the first Premier of the Canadian province of Quebec following the establishment of the Dominion of Canada in 1867.

Recipients

References 

 

Awards established in 1952
Canadian awards
Royal Society of Canada